The 2010 Japan Open Super Series was a top level badminton competition which was held from September 21, 2010 to September 26, 2010 in Tokyo, Japan. It was the seventh BWF Super Series competition on the 2010 BWF Super Series schedule. The total purse for the event was $200,000.

Men's singles

Seeds
 Lee Chong Wei (Champion)
 Peter Gade
 Chen Jin
 Taufik Hidayat
 Lin Dan
 Bao Chunlai
 Nguyen Tien Minh
 Sony Dwi Kuncoro

Results

Women's singles

Seeds
 Wang Yihan 
 Wang Xin
 Wang Shixian
 Tine Baun
 Wang Lin
 Pi Hongyan
 Eriko Hirose
 Yao Jie

Results

Men's doubles

Seeds
 Koo Kien Keat / Tan Boon Heong
 Markis Kido / Hendra Setiawan
 Mathias Boe / Carsten Mogensen
 Guo Zhendong / Xu Chen
 Cai Yun / Fu Haifeng
 Fang Chieh-min / Lee Sheng-mu
 Jung Jae-sung / Lee Yong-dae
 Alvent Yulianto Chandra / Hendra Aprida Gunawan

Results

Women's doubles

Seeds
 Cheng Wen-hsing / Chien Yu-chin
 Miyuki Maeda / Satoko Suetsuna
 Cheng Shu / Zhao Yunlei
 Mizuki Fujii / Reika Kakiiwa
 Wang Xiaoli / Yu Yang
 Pan Pan / Tian Qing
 Kim Min-jung / Lee Hyo-jung
 Meiliana Jauhari / Greysia Polii

Results

Mixed doubles

Seeds
 Nova Widianto / Lilyana Natsir
 Hendra Aprida Gunawan / Vita Marissa
 Thomas Laybourn / Kamilla Rytter Juhl
 Songphon Anugritayawan / Kunchala Voravichitchaikul
 Joachim Fischer Nielsen / Christinna Pedersen
 He Hanbin / Ma Jin
 Chen Hung-ling / Cheng Wen-hsing
 Tao Jiaming / Tian Qing

Results

References

External links
Japan Super Series 2010 at tournamentsoftware.com

Japan Open (badminton)
J
Sports competitions in Tokyo
Japan